The Rolling Stones' Steel Wheels Tour was a concert tour which was launched in North America in August 1989 to promote the band's album Steel Wheels; it continued to Japan in February 1990, with ten shows at the Tokyo Dome. The European leg of the tour, which featured a different stage and logo, was called the Urban Jungle Tour; it ran from May to August 1990. These would be the last live concerts for the band with original member Bill Wyman on bass guitar. This tour would also be the longest the band had ever done up to that point, playing over twice as many shows as their standard tour length from the 1960s and 1970s.

The tour was an enormous financial success, cementing The Rolling Stones' return to full commercial power after a seven-year hiatus in touring marked by well-publicized acrimony among band members.

History
The Rolling Stones began pre-tour preparations in July 1989 at the Wykeham Rise School, a former boarding school for girls in Litchfield, Connecticut. A 25-member entourage, as well as a security force larger than the surrounding towns, was hired to support the band.

The group performed a pre-tour 'surprise show' that took place on 12 August 1989 at Toad's Place in New Haven, Connecticut, with a local act, Sons of Bob, opening the show for an audience of only 700 people who had purchased tickets for $3.01 apiece. The official Steel Wheels Tour kicked off later that month at the now-demolished Veterans Stadium in Philadelphia. During the opening show in Philadelphia, the power went out during "Shattered", and caused a slight delay in the show. Jagger came out and spoke to the crowd during the delay. The Stones returned to Vancouver, B.C. in Canada and played two sold out concerts at B.C. Place Stadium. Fan reaction for tickets was unprecedented. One local radio station, 99.3 The Fox, even had a man (Andrew Korn) sit in front of the station in a bath tub filled with brown sugar and water for free tickets to the concert.

The stage was designed by Mark Fisher with the participation of Charlie Watts and Mick Jagger. Lighting design was by Patrick Woodroffe.

Canadian promoter Michael Cohl made his name buying the concert, sponsorship, merchandising, radio, television, and film rights to the Steel Wheels Tour. It became the most financially successful rock tour in history up to that time. Rival promoter Bill Graham, who also bid on the tour, later wrote that "Losing the Stones was like watching my favourite lover become a whore."

Performances from the tour were documented on the album Flashpoint, and the video Live at the Max, both released in 1991.

Opening acts for the tour included Living Colour, Dan Reed Network, Guns N' Roses and Gun.

The original two dates 13 & 14 July 1990 at Wembley Stadium had to be rescheduled for 24 & 25 August 1990 due to Keith Richards cutting a finger the previous week.

In August 1990, an extra concert in Prague, Czechoslovakia, was added. Czechoslovakia had overthrown the Communist regime nine months earlier, and The Rolling Stones' concert was perceived as a symbolic end of the revolution. Czechoslovakia's new president Václav Havel, a lifelong fan of the band, helped to arrange the event, and met the band at the Prague Castle before the show. Performance expenses were partially covered by Havel and by the Czechoslovak Ministry of Industry. The attendance was over 100,000. The band chose to donate all revenues from the gig (over 4 million Czechoslovak korunas) to the Committee of Good Will, a charity run by Havel's wife Olga Havlová.

Recordings 
Released in 1991, Flashpoint, is a 17-song live album of material recorded during the Steel Wheels/Urban Jungle Tour.

In July 2020, Eagle Rock Entertainment released a recording and DVD set of the final date of the North American tour titled Steel Wheels Live. The performance, recorded at the Atlantic City Convention Center, features guest appearances by John Lee Hooker, Eric Clapton, Axl Rose and Izzy Stradlin.

Personnel

The Rolling Stones
Mick Jagger – lead vocals, guitar, harmonica, percussion
Keith Richards – rhythm guitars, lead guitars, vocals
Ronnie Wood – lead guitars
Bill Wyman – bass guitar
Charlie Watts – drums

Additional musicians
Matt Clifford – keyboards, backing vocals, percussion, French horn
Bobby Keys – saxophone
Chuck Leavell – keyboards, backing vocals and musical director
Bernard Fowler – backing vocals, percussion
Lisa Fischer – backing vocals on the North American & Japanese tours only
Cindy Mizelle – backing vocals on the North American & Japanese tours only
Pamela Quinlan - backing vocals on North American & European tour only
Lorelei McBroom – backing vocals on the European tour only
Sophia Jones – backing vocals on the European tour only
The Uptown Horns:

 Arno Hecht – saxophone
 Bob Funk – trombone
 Crispin Cioe – saxophone
 Paul Litteral – trumpet

Entourage 

 Michael Cohl  –  Tour Director –
 Norman Perry –  Assistant Tour Director
 Alan Dunn – Logistics
 Arnold Dunn – Band Road Manager 
 Timm Wooley – Financial Controller 
 Bob Hurwitz –  Tour Accountant
 Stan Damas – Police Liaison
 Jim Callaghan – Security Chief
 Rowan Brade – Security
 Bob Bender – Security
 Joe Seabrook – Security
 William Horgan – Security
 Linn Tanzmann – Band Press Representative
 Neil Friedman – Assistant Tour Publicist
 Bennett Kleinberg – Advance Tour Publicist
 Dimo Safari – Tour Photographer
 Beth Kittrell – Administrative Assistant
 Caroline Clements – Makeup 
 Robern Pickering – Wardrobe 
 Fiona Williams – Stylist
 LaVelle Smith – Choreographer
 Torje Eike – Physiotherapist
 Joseph Sakowicz – Band/Entourage Luggage 
 Shelley Lazar – Ticket/Credentials Coordinator
 Miranda Guinness – Asst. to Mick Jagger
 Tony Russell – Asst. to Keith Richards 
 Jo Howard – Asst. to Ron Wood
 Tony King – Mick Jagger Press Liaison
 Patricia Aleck – Travel Advance 
 Cliff Burnstein – Creative Consultant
 Peter Mensch – Creative Consultant

Production 
 Michael Ahern – Production Manager
 Chuch Magee – Backline Crew Chief
 Roy Lamb – Stage Manager
 Mark Fisher – Set Designer
 Patrick Woodroffe – Lighting Designer
 Benji Lefevre – FOH Sound Engineer
 Chris Wade-Evans – Monitor Sound Engineer
 Pierre De Beauport – Guitar Technician
 Andy Topeka – Keyboard Technician
 Steve Thomas – Production Advance
 Steve Howard – Promoter Production Rep
 Bruce Haynes - Electrician
 Shane Hendrick - Electrician
 David Sinclair- Electrician
 Henry Wetzel - Electrician

Tour set lists
For the opening night of the Steel Wheels Tour the setlist was as follows (all songs composed by Jagger/Richards unless otherwise noted):

 "Start Me Up"
 "Bitch"
 "Shattered"
 "Sad Sad Sad"
 "Undercover of the Night"
 "Harlem Shuffle" (Relf/Nelson)
 "Tumbling Dice"
 "Miss You"
 "Ruby Tuesday"
 "Play with Fire" (Nanker Phelge)
 "Dead Flowers"
 "One Hit (To the Body)" (Jagger/Richards/Wood)
 "Mixed Emotions"
 "Honky Tonk Women"
 "Rock and a Hard Place"
 "Midnight Rambler"
 "You Can't Always Get What You Want"
 "Little Red Rooster" (Dixon)
 "Before They Make Me Run"
 "Happy"
 "Paint It Black"
 "2000 Light Years from Home"
 "Sympathy for the Devil"
 "Gimme Shelter"
 "It's Only Rock 'n Roll (But I Like It)"
 "Brown Sugar"
 "(I Can't Get No) Satisfaction"
 "Jumpin' Jack Flash" (encore)

For the final night of the Urban Jungle Tour (the last Rolling Stones concert with Bill Wyman) the band played:

 "Start Me Up"
 "Sad Sad Sad"
 "Harlem Shuffle"
 "Tumbling Dice"
 "Miss You"
 "Ruby Tuesday"
 "Angie"
 "Rock and a Hard Place"
 "Mixed Emotions"
 "Honky Tonk Women"
 "Midnight Rambler"
 "You Can't Always Get What You Want"
 "Before They Make Me Run"
 "Happy"
 "Paint It Black"
 "2000 Light Years from Home"
 "Sympathy for the Devil"
 "Street Fighting Man"
 "Gimme Shelter"
 "It's Only Rock 'n Roll (But I Like It)"
 "Brown Sugar"
 "Jumpin' Jack Flash"
 "(I Can't Get No) Satisfaction" (encore)

Other songs played on the tour:
 "Almost Hear You Sigh" (Jagger/Richards/Jordan)
 "Blinded By Love"
 "Boogie Chillen" (Hooker)
 "Can't Be Seen"
 "Factory Girl"
 "I Just Want to Make Love to You" (Dixon)
 "Salt of the Earth"
 "Terrifying"

Tour dates

See also
 Rolling Stones concerts
 List of highest grossing concert tours

Notes

References

External links
 Mark Fisher's "Steel Wheels" gallery
 Mark Fisher's "Urban Jungle" gallery

The Rolling Stones concert tours
1989 concert tours
1990 concert tours
1989 in American music
1989 in Canadian music
1990 in Japanese music
1990 in Europe